Pakicetinae is a subfamily of Pakicetidae of the order Archaeoceti. Pakicetinae were terrestrial and amphibious mammals found in Asia.

References

Pakicetidae